French Field is a multi-purpose stadium in the northwest United States, located in Kent, Washington, a suburb southeast of Seattle. It is a stadium for high school teams in the area including Kent-Meridian High School, Kentlake High School, Kentridge High School, and Kentwood High School football, soccer and track teams.

The stadium is also home for the Seattle Majestics, a professional women's football team in the Women's National Football Conference and was home to the King County Jaguars, a semi-professional football team in the North American Football League.  

French Field is also used for community organizations like Kent Youth Soccer Association. The Kent School District uses this field for middle school and elementary school sporting events such as track. 

Adjacent to Kent-Meridian High School, it opened  in 1982; its running track is open daily to the general public. It is also used for Kent-Meridian's physical education curriculum.

See also 
Kent-Meridian High School
Kentlake High School
Kentridge High School
Kentwood High School
Kent School District
King County Jaguars
City of Kent

External links
Seattle Majestics

Sports venues in Kent, Washington
Buildings and structures in Kent, Washington
Defunct National Premier Soccer League stadiums
1982 establishments in Washington (state)
Sports venues completed in 1982
Soccer venues in Washington (state)
American football venues in Washington (state)
Athletics (track and field) venues in Washington (state)
High school football venues in the United States